"Anyway" (stylized as "aNYway") is the debut single by American–Canadian DJ duo Duck Sauce. It was released in the United Kingdom on October 25, 2009 by digital download. It peaked at number 22 on the UK Singles Chart, number 1 on the UK Dance Chart and number 1 on the UK Indie Chart. On October 9, 2009, the 1970s style music video was uploaded on YouTube.

"Anyway" is largely sampled from the 1979 song "I Can Do It (Anyway You Want)" by Final Edition.

Critical reception
David Balls of Digital Spy gave the song a positive review stating:

From his 1999 chart-topper 'You Don't Know Me' to his recent collaboration with Dizzee Rascal on 'Bonkers', Armand Van Helden has always been a DJ with crossover appeal. So when he formed Duck Sauce with fellow New Yorker A-Trak - Kanye West's turntablist of choice - the ripples of excitement were quick to make their way across the, ahem, pond.

First offering 'aNYway' finds the pair on a mission to put some "oogie in your boogie" as they dish up a club banger inspired by their hometown. Blending funky '70s disco - courtesy of a sample from Final Edition's 'I Can Do It' - with throbbing house beats, 'aNYway' works a cool retro vibe while still making sense in the present. It's the closest most of us will come to Nights On Broadway this autumn, but it's none too shabby a substitute.

Track listings

Charts

Release history

References

External links
Review of debut single 'aNYway' on Daily Music Guide
, Released October 9, 2009

2009 debut singles
Duck Sauce songs
Songs written by Armand Van Helden
Data Records singles
2009 songs